The capped conebill (Conirostrum albifrons) is a species of bird in the family Thraupidae.

It is found in Bolivia, Colombia, Ecuador, Peru, and Venezuela. Its natural habitats are subtropical or tropical moist montane forests and heavily degraded former forest.

References

capped conebill
Birds of the Northern Andes
capped conebill
Taxonomy articles created by Polbot